Karl Momen (born 1934) is a Swedish architect, painter and sculptor. He was born in the city of Mashad, Iran.

Works
Momen is the creator of the Metaphor: The Tree of Utah, an  sculpture resembling a tree in the Bonneville Salt Flats off of Interstate 80. Apparently, while driving along the highway to California, Momen had a vision of a tree in the desert. He financed the project himself and built it from 1982 to 1986, afterwards donating the sculpture to the state of Utah.

The Iranian-born Momen, who painted portraits of Stalin and the Shah of Iran early in his career, later studied with the surrealist painter Max Ernst, and studied architecture at the Kunst Academy in Stuttgart, Germany. It has been said that he was moved to create the  tree by the "vastness and relative emptiness" of the Bonneville Salt Flats, and that the tree "brings space, nature, myth and technology together". The tree's six spheres are all coated with natural rock and minerals found within the state of Utah, and the pods below symbolize the changing of the seasons, when trees naturally transform themselves. The tree is the property of the State of Utah.

References

External links
Nexus: Paintings by Karl Momen – International Arts & Artists
"About", from Momen's official website.

American art
Swedish male sculptors
Living people
Iranian emigrants to Sweden
1934 births